Falling Away is the second album by American rock band Crossfade, released on August 29, 2006. According to Mitch James, the band's bass player, the album has sold a little over 200,000 copies to date, short of the platinum status of their self-titled debut. As a result, Crossfade parted ways with Columbia Records. The album spawned three singles: "Invincible", "Drown You Out", and "Already Gone". The song "Breathing Slowly" was also on the band's first album, Numb, which they released in 1999 under the name The Nothing.

Track listing 
All tracks written by Ed Sloan and Mitch James.

Music videos
A music video of the song "Invincible" was released shortly after the song was released. A live video of "Drown You Out" was released as well, but features the band's new guitarist Les Hall and bassist Mitch James singing Sahaj Ticotin's vocal part of the song.

Personnel
Crossfade
 Ed Sloan - guitar, lead vocals , backing vocals
 Mitch James - bass, backing vocals, shared lead vocals 
 James Branham - drums, percussion

Additional personnel
 Sahaj Ticotin – vocals

References

2006 albums
Crossfade (band) albums
Columbia Records albums